Brian McKim is an American stand-up comedian. He was born and raised in New Jersey, calling himself "the Pride of Pennsauken", but moved to Los Angeles in 1988. He began performing in 1981.

In addition to performing as a standup comic, he is also a comedy writer.  He has contributed to Fox Television's Comic Strip Live and was, along with his wife, professional comedian and writer, on the creative team for The John Debella Show.  They co-authored a book, The Comedy Bible: The Complete Resource for Aspiring Comedians (release date: October 1, 2011).

Personal life
In 1981, he received a bachelor of science degree in journalism from Temple University.

His wife, Traci Skene, is also a stand-up comedian.

References

American stand-up comedians
Living people
Year of birth missing (living people)
Temple University alumni